Haeun can refer to:

Haeun (Jeungsando), a principle of the Jeungsando faith.
Choe Chi-won, a Silla philosopher sometimes known by his pen name Haeun
Haeundae-gu, Busan
Kim Hae-woon (born 1973), South Korean footballer
Ha-eun, Korean feminine given name